Jean Théodore Latour (1766–1837) was a French pianist and composer. He wrote several piano sonatinas that have been adapted for early intermediate piano students. His work appears in several books designed for such students. Latour was appointed official pianist to the Prince Regent, later King George IV of the United Kingdom.

References

External links
Theodore Latour at IMSLP.

1766 births
1837 deaths
French composers
French male composers
Male pianists